Legislative Assembly elections were held in Sikkim on 12 October 1979 to elect the 32 members of the second Legislative Assembly.

Results

Elected members

References

State Assembly elections in Sikkim
1970s in Sikkim
Sikkim